Sogodjankoli is a town in the Sami Department of Banwa Province in western Burkina Faso. As of 2005, it had a population of 1,769.

References

Populated places in the Boucle du Mouhoun Region
Banwa Province